Dongola racing is a popular event in traditional local regattas, especially on the River Thames in southern England and was first competed at Maidenhead in 1886.  Competitors use wide punts and a team of (usually six) people with single-bladed paddles, facing forwards and kneeling, normally with one leg up and one leg down. The person at the rear is responsible for the steering with their paddle.

Origins
Dongola racing originates from Lord Wolseley's Nile Expedition of 1884–1885  to relieve Charles George Gordon at Khartoum. Lord Wolsey offered £100 to the battalion that covered the 370 miles from Sarras to Debbeh in the fastest time. The route passed through Dongola in the  northern Sudan. The Royal Irish Regiment beat the Black Watch in a close finish.

Competitors

Some competitors take the racing very seriously and practise extensively before the race and demonstrate a high level of skill. Others may turn up on the day and treat the event in a light-hearted manner and in fancy dress.

Regattas
Dongola racing takes place at the following regattas:
 Cookham Regatta
 Goring and Streatley Regatta
Sonning Regatta
Sunbury Amateur Regatta
Wargrave and Shiplake Regatta
Selected Skiffing club regattas

See also 
 Dragon boat racing

References

External links 
 Definition from TheFreeDictionary.com

Paddling
1886 introductions
Sport on the River Thames